Arthur Samuel Kendall (March 25, 1861 – July 18, 1944) was a physician and political figure in Nova Scotia, Canada. He represented Cape Breton in the House of Commons of Canada from 1900 to 1904 as a Liberal member.

He was born in Sydney, Nova Scotia, the son of the Reverend S.F. Kendall. Kendall was educated at Mount Allison College, Halifax Medical College, Bellevue Hospital Medical School in New York City and Guy's Hospital Medical School in London. He became a member of the Royal College of Surgeons in 1884 and was Medical Health Officer for Cape Breton. Kendall served as a town councillor for Sydney in 1888. Kendall ran unsuccessfully for a seat in the House of Commons in 1896. He represented Cape Breton County in the Nova Scotia House of Assembly from 1897 to 1900 and from 1904 to 1911.

A social reformer, he was concerned about poverty and the impact of industrialization on Cape Breton Island. He supported improving workers' living conditions, old-age pensions, a shorter work week and a workmen's compensation act. He was nicknamed the "miner's friend" because of his support for coal mine workers.

His brother, Henry Ernest Kendall, served as Lieutenant-Governor of Nova Scotia in the 1940s.

References 
 Canadian Parliamentary Guide, 1905, AJ Magurn
 

1861 births
1944 deaths
Nova Scotia Liberal Party MLAs
Members of the House of Commons of Canada from Nova Scotia
Liberal Party of Canada MPs
Mount Allison University alumni
Social reformers
People from Sydney, Nova Scotia
Nova Scotia municipal councillors